Rafsanjani is a surname. Notable people with the surname include:
 Akbar Hashemi Rafsanjani, former president of Iran and an influential Iranian politician
 Faezeh Hashemi Rafsanjani, the third child of Akbar Hashemi Rafsanjani
 Yasser Hashemi Rafsanjani, the fifth child of Akbar Hashemi Rafsanjani
 Mehdi Hashemi Rafsanjani, the fourth child of Akbar Hashemi Rafsanjani
 Mohammad Hashemi Rafsanjani, Iranian politician who has been a member of the Expediency Discernment Council
 Nazanin Rafsanjani, contributor to episodes of This American Life